Marcos Giménez may refer to:

 Marcos Giménez (footballer, born 1989), Argentine midfielder
 Marcos Giménez (footballer, born 1991), Paraguayan midfielder